The 1991 Copper Bowl was an American college football bowl game played on December 31, 1991, at Arizona Stadium in Tucson, Arizona.  The game featured the Indiana Hoosiers and the Baylor Bears.

In the first quarter, Indiana quarterback Trent Green scored on a 1-yard touchdown run making it 7–0 Indiana. In the second quarter, Indiana got a 27-yard field goal from Bonnell making the lead 10–0. Vaughn Dunbar scored on a 5-yard touchdown run giving Indiana a 17–0 halftime lead. In the fourth quarter, Trent Green scored on a 4-yard touchdown run, making the final margin 24–0.  Through the conclusion of the 2022 season, the 1991 Copper Bowl is Indiana's most recent bowl win.

Statistics

Source:

References

Copper Bowl
Guaranteed Rate Bowl
Baylor Bears football bowl games
Indiana Hoosiers football bowl games
Sports in Tucson, Arizona
Copper Bowl
Events in Tucson, Arizona